Epiphyas ocyptera is a species of moth of the family Tortricidae. It is found in Australia, where it has been recorded from Victoria.

References

Moths described in 1910
Epiphyas